PNO may refer to: 

 Pa-O National Organization, a political organization of the Pa-O people in Burma
 Pagan's Night Out, a social get-together held in Pagan and Neopagan communities 
 Payment Network Operator, an operator of a network to perform for example credit card transactions
 Pecunia non olet, Latin for "money does not smell"
 Piano, in music notation
 Plasma-Nitrided Oxide
 Pneumothorax, in pulmonology
 Port of New Orleans, a port located in New Orleans, Louisiana
 Premerger Notification Office, in US FTC
 Public Network Operator
 Pyridine-N-oxide